Whistle was an American 1980s hip hop and contemporary R&B group that was composed of Jazzy Jazz, Kool Doobie, and DJ Silver Spinner. The group later brought in Kraze and then Terk after Kool Doobie left the group to go solo. Their biggest hit single as a hip hop group was "(Nothing Serious) Just Buggin'" in 1986.

Biography
The group's first two albums, Whistle (released in 1986) and Transformation (released in 1988) were produced by the Kangol Kid from UTFO and DJ Howie Tee. Kangol and Howie brought in keyboardist/sound wizard Gary Pozner (who had already become a staff producer at Select Records) to handle the sound sampling and help with beat creation. A fourth album, Get the Love, was  released in 1992.

After the release of their second album, the group gave up rhyming in favor of a contemporary R&B sound ("Barbara's Bedroom" (1987), "Bad Habit" (1990) and love ballads, including "Chance for Our Love" (1986), "Please Love Me" (1986), "Still My Girl" (1987) and "Right Next to Me" (1988). The group's biggest R&B hit single was a cover version of Heatwave's "Always and Forever" (1990). After this, the group disbanded, as Jazzy Jazz went on to form another group called G.H.P. (Group Home Productions) with Free Daydreamer of the group Entouch and Will Skillz of the group Pure Blend. Terk went on to become involved in local and national politics while continuing work as an entrepreneur in entertainment.

"Right Next to Me" became a popular song in the Philippines, with some Filipino singers covering it, such as Jed Madela, Aaron, Johann Escanan and Kimpoy Feliciano.

Discography

Albums
Whistle (1986)
Transformation (1988)
Always & Forever (1990)
Get the Love (1992)
The Best of Whistle (1995)

Singles

References

External links
 

Select Records artists
American contemporary R&B musical groups
American hip hop groups